"Julia Says" is a song by Scottish band Wet Wet Wet, released as the second single from their sixth studio album, Picture This. It was released on 13 March 1995 and peaked at number three on the UK Singles Chart. Outside the UK, "Julia Says" reached number three in Ireland and number eight in Iceland but experienced limited success elsewhere. Marti Pellow recorded his own version of the song for inclusion on his 2002 album Marti Pellow Sings the Hits of Wet Wet Wet & Smile.

Track listings
UK CD1
 "Julia Says"
 "It's Now or Never" (live from the Elvis Tribute Concert)
 "I Don't Want to Know"
 "Julia Says" (synth string version)

UK CD2
 "Julia Says"
 "It's Now or Never" (live from the Elvis Tribute Concert)
 "Dixie"
 "Julia Says" (live from Tarlair Music Festival)

UK 7-inch and cassette single
 "Julia Says"
 "It's Now or Never" (live from the Elvis Tribute Concert)

Credits and personnel
Credits are lifted from the UK CD1 liner notes and the Picture This album booklet.

Studios
 Recorded between May 1993 and October 1994 at Chipping Norton (Chipping Norton, England), The Brill Building (Glasgow, Scotland), and Windmill Lane (Dublin, Ireland)

Personnel

 Wet Wet Wet – production, arrangement
 Graeme Clark – writing, fretless bass, assorted basses, production
 Tommy Cunningham – writing, drums, percussion
 Neil Mitchell – writing, keyboards, piano
 Marti Pellow – writing, vocals
 Fiachra Trench – orchestration
 Paul Spong – trumpet

 Neil Sidwell – trombone
 Graeme Duffin – all guitars, production
 Bob Clearmountain – mixing
 Ian Morrow – programming
 Simon Vinestock – engineering
 Andrew Boland – string engineering

Charts

Weekly charts

Year-end charts

Certifications

References

1995 singles
1995 songs
Mercury Records singles
Songs written by Graeme Clark (musician)
Songs written by Marti Pellow
Songs written by Neil Mitchell (musician)
Songs written by Tommy Cunningham
Wet Wet Wet songs